Záblatí is a municipality and village in Prachatice District in the South Bohemian Region of the Czech Republic. It has about 300 inhabitants.

Administrative parts
Villages and hamlets of Albrechtovice, Hlásná Lhota, Horní Záblatí, Křišťanovice, Řepešín, Saladín and Zvěřenice are administrative parts of Záblatí.

References

Villages in Prachatice District
Prácheňsko
Bohemian Forest